James Begg (1808–1883) was a Scottish minister.

James Begg may also refer to:
James T. Begg (1877–1963), American politician in Ohio
James Livingstone Begg (1874–1958), Scottish geologist
Jim Begg (1920–1987), Scottish footballer

See also
James Beggs (disambiguation)
James "Beag" Stewart